General John Howard, 15th Earl of Suffolk, 8th Earl of Berkshire, FSA (7 March 1739 – 23 January 1820) was a British soldier and nobleman.

Howard was the third (but second surviving) son of Capt. Philip Howard of the Royal Marines, grandson of Philip Howard. His father died in 1741. John was a Page of Honour to the Duke of Cumberland from 1745 to 1748, and in 1756, was commissioned an ensign in the 1st Regiment of Foot Guards. He was promoted Lieutenant and Captain in 1760; his eldest brother Thomas held the same rank in the same regiment at the time. He was promoted Captain-Lieutenant in March 1773, and Captain and Lieutenant-Colonel in May 1773. He married Julia, daughter of Rev. John Gaskarth, Esq. of Hutton Hall, Penrith, Cumberland on 2 July 1774. They had five children:
Charles Nevinson Howard, Viscount Andover (13 May 1775 – 11 January 1800), married Elizabeth Coke, daughter of Thomas Coke by his first wife, without issue
Thomas Howard, 16th Earl of Suffolk (1776–1851)
Hon. John Howard (30 November 1777 – 1787)
William Philip Howard (27 November 1779 – 20 April 1780)
Lady Catherine Howard (27 November 1779 – 30 March 1850), married Rev. George Bisset, without issue

Both John and Thomas were Captains and Lieutenant-Colonels of the Guards in 1776, at the commencement of the American Revolution. Thomas was among the detachment first detailed for service in America, and was killed in 1778 in a fight with a privateer while returning home. John was sent to America in April 1779, and was present for the various skirmishing campaigns the Guards undertook that year. He was promoted Colonel in 1780, and succeeded Edward Mathew as Brigadier-General, temporarily commanding the Brigade of Guards in February 1780. Under his command, the two battalions of Guards embarked from New York and joined Lord Cornwallis in Charleston, South Carolina in December 1780, where Charles O'Hara returned from England and took over command of the Brigade.

Howard served in Cornwallis' southern campaign, and was wounded at Guilford Court House. Sent home with despatches on 14 June 1781, he arrived in England a month later, thus escaping the surrender at Yorktown. In 1783, he succeeded a distant cousin as Earl of Suffolk. Later that year, he was appointed colonel of the 70th (Surrey) Regiment of Foot, which he held until 1814. He was made a Fellow of the Society of Antiquaries in 1785, and was promoted major-general in 1787, lieutenant-general in 1789, and general in 1802.

Appointed Governor of Londonderry and Culmore in 1806, he became Colonel of the 44th (East Essex) Regiment of Foot in 1814, and died in 1820. He was succeeded by his son Thomas.

References

1739 births
1820 deaths
British Army generals
British Army personnel of the American Revolutionary War
Fellows of the Society of Antiquaries of London
John
John
East Surrey Regiment officers
Essex Regiment officers
Grenadier Guards officers
John Howard, 15th Earl of Suffolk